The following lists events that happened during 1887 in the Kingdom of Belgium.

Incumbents
Monarch: Leopold II
Prime Minister: Auguste Marie François Beernaert

Events

 Progressive Party founded, led by Paul Janson
 24 August – Soldiers fire upon Ostend trawlermen protesting the favouritism shown to British trawlermen
 21 December – Achel Abbey buys the buildings of Rochefort Abbey to restore the monastery there

Publications
Periodicals
 Le Soir begins publication

Books
 Alphonse Dubois, Faune des vertébrés de la Belgique: Série des oiseaux (Brussels, A la librairie C. Muquardt, Th. Falk Sr), vol. 1

Art and architecture

 Brussels City Museum inaugurated

Paintings
 James Ensor, Carnaval sur la plage
 Fernand Khnopff, Portrait of Marguerite Khnopff

Buildings
 Franz Seulen, Schaarbeek railway station
 Work starts on Provinciaal Hof, Bruges

Births
 6 January – Berthe Bovy, actress (died 1977)
 14 January – Félix Rousseau, historian (died 1981) 
 28 March – Pierre Nothomb, writer (died 1966)
 23 April – Georges-Marie de Jonghe d'Ardoye, papal diplomat (died 1961)
 8 June – Émile Dupont, Olympic marksman (died 1959)
 25 October – Léon Darrien, gymnast (died 1973)
 27 October – Philippe Le Hardy de Beaulieu, fencer (died 1942)
 23 November – Paul de Maleingreau, composer (died 1956)

Deaths
 11 February – François Laurent (born 1810), historian
 4 March – Peter Jan Beckx (born 1795), Jesuit
 16 July – Laurent-Guillaume de Koninck (born 1809), palaeontologist
 17 July – Nicaise De Keyser (born 1813), painter
 20 November – Louis Gallait (born 1810), painter
 29 December – Jules Van Praet (born 1806), diplomat

References

 
1880s in Belgium
Belgium
Years of the 19th century in Belgium
Belgium